In enzymology, a codeinone reductase (NADPH) is an enzyme that catalyzes the chemical reaction

codeine + NADP+  codeinone + NADPH + H+

Thus, the two substrates of this enzyme are codeine and NADP+, whereas its 3 products are codeinone, NADPH, and H+.

This enzyme belongs to the family of oxidoreductases, specifically those acting on the CH-OH group of donor with NAD+ or NADP+ as acceptor. The systematic name of this enzyme class is codeine:NADP+ oxidoreductase. This enzyme participates in alkaloid biosynthesis i.

References

 
 

EC 1.1.1
NADPH-dependent enzymes
Enzymes of unknown structure